Travná  or Krutvald is a small village located in Rychlebské Hory (German Reichensteiner Gebirge) in the Olomouc Region, in the northeastern part of the Czech Republic. Today, the village is part of the town of Javorník. The population was 53 according to the 2001 census.

History
According to Statistik des Deutschen Reichs, Band 450; Teil II - Sudetendeutsche Gebiete und Memelland Travná had 438 inhabitants in 1930 and 375 in 1939.

Notes

References
 Gernot, Ludwig und Wolf, Kurt  - Jauernig und das Jauerniger Ländchen. Das 2. Heimatbuch des ehemaligen Gerichtsbezirkes Jauernig - 1995.
 Hosák, Ladislav - Historický místopis Moravy a Slezska v letech 1848-1960 - 1967, Profil Ostrava.
 Kuča, Karel - Města a městečka v Čechách, na Moravě a ve Slezsku II. díl - 1997, Libri Praha.
 Pachl, Hans - Jauernig und das Jauerniger Ländchen. Ein Heimatbuch des ehemaligen Gerichtsbezirks Jauernig - 1983.
 Statistik des Deutschen Reichs, Band 450; Teil II - Sudetendeutsche Gebiete und Memelland. Amtliches Gemeindeverzeichnis für das Deutsche Reich. Berlin. 1939

External links 

 Website of microregion Javornicko
 Web-page about the Rychlebské Hory and Jeseníky mountains
 Web-page about the Rychlebské Hory region

Neighbourhoods in the Czech Republic
Populated places in Jeseník District